Dmitrii Dmitrievich Safronov (born 12 October 1995) is a Russian Paralympic athlete who specializes in the 100 m and 200 m sprint.

Career
Safronov is a four-time World Champion, having won gold in the 100m and 200m T35 events in 2013 and in 2015. In 2019 he won a silver and a bronze in the 200m and 100m, respectively.

Safronov represented Russian Paralympic Committee athletes at the 2020 Summer Paralympics and won gold medals in the 100 metres and 200 metres T35 events.

References

1995 births
Living people
People from Dzerzhinsk, Russia
Medalists at the World Para Athletics European Championships
Medalists at the World Para Athletics Championships
Paralympic athletes of Russia
Athletes (track and field) at the 2020 Summer Paralympics
Medalists at the 2020 Summer Paralympics
Paralympic medalists in athletics (track and field)
Paralympic gold medalists for the Russian Paralympic Committee athletes
Russian male sprinters
Sportspeople from Nizhny Novgorod Oblast